Orthonevra nigrovittata (Loew, 1876), the black-lined mucksucker, is a rare species of syrphid fly.  It has been observed in California. Hoverflies get their names from the ability to remain nearly motionless while in flight. The  adults are also  known as flower flies for they are commonly found around and on flowers from which they get both energy-giving nectar and protein rich pollen. Larvae for this genus are of the rat-tailed type. O. nigrovittata larvae have not been described.

References

Eristalinae

Insects described in 1876
Taxa named by Hermann Loew